Karen Leeder (born 1962) is a British writer, translator and scholar of German culture. She is professor of Modern German Literature in the University of Oxford. In 2021 she was elected as Schwarz-Taylor Professor of the German Language and Literature, a position she took up at The Queen's College, Oxford in 2022.

Early life and education
Born in Derbyshire, she lived in Rugby and attended Rugby High School and Rugby School. She studied German at Magdalen College, Oxford and the University of Hamburg.

Career
She taught at Emmanuel College, Cambridge for three years as Official Fellow in German, from 1990 before taking up a post as a Fellow at New College, Oxford in 1993. Her interests include post-war German literature, the literature of the GDR, German poetry in translation, Brecht, Rilke, spectres and angels.

From 1993 to 2022 she was Fellow in German at New College Oxford. In 2021 she was elected as Schwarz-Taylor Professor of the German Language and Literature, a position she took up at The Queen's College, Oxford in 2022. She is professor of Modern German Literature in the University of Oxford. In 2023 she embarks on a three-year Einstein fellowship at the Free University of Berlin on the project AfterWords.

In 2017 she became a Fellow of the Royal Society of Arts and in 2020 she was elected to the Academia Europaea.

She is a translator, and she has won prizes for her translations of Volker Braun, Evelyn Schlag, Durs Grünbein and Ulrike Almut Sandig. She has published widely on German culture, including several volumes on Rilke and Brecht. With Christopher Young and Michael Eskin, she was commissioning editor for the de Gruyter series of Companions to Contemporary German Culture (2012–2022).

Publications
 Breaking Boundaries: A New Generation of Poets in the GDR (OUP, 1996).
 With Tom Kuhn, The Young Brecht (London: Libris, 1992, paperback 1996)
 Editor, with Tom Kuhn, Empedocles’ Shoe: Essays on Brecht's poetry (London: Methuen, 2002)
 Editor, with Erdmut Wizisla, O Chicago! O Widerspruch!: Ein Hundert Gedichte auf Brecht (Berlin: Transit, 2006)
 Editor, Schaltstelle: Neue deutsche Lyrik im Dialog, German Monitor 69 (Amsterdam, Atlanta, GA: Rodopi, 2007)
 Editor, Flaschenpost: German Poetry and the Long Twentieth Century, Special Edition of German Life and Letters (GLL, LX, No. 3, 2007)
 Editor, From Stasiland to Ostalgie. The GDR Twenty Years After, A special edition of Oxford German Studies, OGS, 38.3 (Oxford, 2009)
 Editor, with Robert Vilain, The Cambridge Companion to Rilke (Cambridge: CUP, 2009)
 Editor, with Robert Vilain, Nach Duino: Studien zu Rainer Maria Rilkes späten Gedichten (Göttingen: Wallstein, 2009)
 Editor, with Laura Bradley, Brecht & the GDR: Politics, Culture, Posterity, Edinburgh German Yearbook, vol. 5 (Rochester, NY: Camden House, 2011)
 Editor, with Michael Eskin and Christopher Young, Durs Grünbein: A Companion (Berlin, New York: de Gruyter, 2013)
 Editor, Figuring Lateness in Modern German Culture, special edition of New German Critique, 42.1, 125, (2015)
 Editor, Rereading East Germany: The Literature and Film of the GDR (Cambridge: CUP, 2016, paperback 2019)
 Editor, with Lyn Marven, Ulrike Draesner: A Companion (Berlin, New York: de Gruyter, 2022)

Translations
 Michael Krüger, Scenes from the Life of a Best-selling Author, trans. Leeder (London: Harvill, 2002; pbk. Vintage, 2004).
 Raoul Schrott, The Desert of Lop, trans. Leeder (London: Macmillan Picador, 2004).
 Evelyn Schlag, Selected Poems, ed. and trans. by Leeder (Manchester: Carcanet, 2004). Winner of Schlegel Tieck Prize for Translation 2005.
 Hans Magnus Enzensberger, Fatal Numbers: Why count on Chance?, trans. by Leeder (New York: Upper West Side Philosophers, 2011). Shortlisted for National Book Critics Circle Award 2011.
 Wilhelm Schmid, High on Low: Harnessing the Power of Unhappiness, trans. by Leeder (New York: Upper West Side Philosophers, 2014). Winner of Independent Publisher Book Award for Self Help (2015), Named Finalist for a Next Generation Indie Book Award for Self Help (2015); Gold Medal and Winner of Living Now Book Award (2015)
 Volker Braun, Rubble Flora: Selected Poems, trans. by David Constantine and Leeder (Calcutta, London, New York: Seagull, 2014). Commended for Popescu Poetry Translation Prize 2015.
 Michael Krüger, Last Day of the Year: Selected Poems, trans. Leeder (New York, London: Sheep Meadow, 2014).
 Ulrike Almut Sandig, Thick of it, trans. Leeder (Calcutta, London, New York: Seagull, 2018).
 Evelyn Schlag, All Under One Roof, trans. Leeder (Manchester, Carcanet, 2018).
 Raoul Schrott, The Sex of the Angel: The Saints in their Heaven: A Breviary, trans. by Leeder (London, New York: Seagull, 2018)
 Ulrike Almut Sandig, Grimm, trans. by Leeder (Oxford: Hurst Street, 2018), special limited edition with illustrations.
 Michael Krüger, The God behind the Window, trans. by Leeder and Peter Thompson (London, New York: Seagull, 2019).
 Gerd Ludwig, Evelyn Schlag, Leeder, I LOVE AFRICA, Festival La Gacilly-Baden Photo 2018 (Baden: Lammerhuber, 2019).
 Michael Krüger, Postscript, trans. by Leeder (New York, Sheep Meadow, 2019).
 Ulrike Almut Sandig, I am a field full of rapeseed give cover to deer and shine like thirteen oil paintings laid one on top of the other, trans. by Leeder (Calcutta, New York, London: Seagull, 2020).
 Durs Grünbein,  Porcelain: Poem on the Downfall of my City, trans. by Leeder (Calcutta, New York, London: Seagull, 2020).
 Durs Grünbein, For the Dying Calves. Beyond Literature. Oxford Lectures, trans. by Leeder  (Calcutta, New York, London: Seagull, 2021).
 Ulrike Almut Sandig,Monsters Like Us, trans. by Leeder (Calcutta, New York, London: Seagull, 2022).
 Volker Braun, Great Fugue, trans. by Leeder and David Constantine (Ripon: Smokestack, 2022).

Prizes 
 2000 Literarisches Colloquium Berlin summer school scholarship
 2002 One month Writer in Residence LCB
 2005 Winner of Schlegel Tieck Prize for Evelyn Schlag Selected Poems (Carcanet, 2004)
 2013 Winner of Times Stephen Spender Prize for Durs Grünbein, 'Childhood in the Diorama'
 2014 Deutsche Übersetzerfonds/Goethe Institut: 'ViceVersa: Deutsch-Englische Übersetzerwerkstatt im LCB', 2014, Berlin (Ulrike Almut Sandig) 
 2014 Robert Bosch Stiftung/Goethe Institut: 'Frühling der Barbaren. Deutschsprachige Literatur aktuell' 2014 (Berlin, Leipzig)
 2014–15 Knowledge Exchange Fellow, University of Oxford/Southbank Centre, London
 2015 Translation of High on Low (Upper West Side philosophers' Inc., 2014) Winner of Independent Publisher Book Award for Self Help (2015), Named Finalist for a Next Generation Indie Book Award for Self Help (2015); Gold Medal and Winner of Living Now Book Award for Personal Growth (2015)
 2016 English PEN, EUNIC, European Literature Festival, New European Literature Translation pitch overall winner for translations of Ulrike Almut Sandig Thick of it (2016)
 2016 American PEN PEN/Heim Translation award for Ulrike Almut Sandig, Thick of it
 2017 The John Frederick Nims Memorial Prize for Translation for Durs Grünbein, 'The Doctrine of Photography' Poetry, 2018 
 2021 Winner of Schlegel-Tieck Prize for Durs Grünbein, Porcelain: Poem on the Downfall of my City, trans. by Leeder (Seagull, 2021).

References

External links
Mediating Modern Poetry – her website

1962 births
Living people
German–English translators
People educated at Rugby High School for Girls
Alumni of Magdalen College, Oxford
Fellows of New College, Oxford
 Fellows of The Queen's College, Oxford
German literature academics